Otocinclus flexilis, known in the aquarium trade as the peppered otocinclus, is a species of catfish in the family Loricariidae. It is native to South America, where it is known from the Lagoa Dos Patos drainage basin in Brazil. The species reaches 6.8 cm (2.7 inches) in total length.

References 

Hypoptopomatini
Fish described in 1894
Fauna of Brazil
Taxa named by Edward Drinker Cope